Champagne Beach is a popular beach located on the island of Espiritu Santo in Vanuatu. The beach is famous for its crystal clear waters and powdery white sands, which is one of the best in the South Pacific region. It is visited regularly by tourists and cruise boats from Australia.

Champagne Beach is located in adjacent and close proximity to Hog Harbour village on the northeast of Santo.

Beaches of Vanuatu